The Dennis R series is a rear-engined coach chassis built by Dennis (and later TransBus/Alexander Dennis), it was unveiled in 1999.

External links
Product description in Alexander Dennis Website

R
Bus chassis